The naval Battle of Sapienza, also known as the Battle of Porto-Longo or Battle of Zonklon, took place on 4 November 1354, during the Third Venetian–Genoese War.

The Genoese fleet under Paganino Doria captured the Venetian fleet under Niccolò Pisani of 35 galleys and made 5,000 prisoners at the harbour of Sapienza or Porto Longo, between the fortresses of Modon (mod. Methoni) and Navarino or Zonklon (Pylos) in southern Greece.

Genoa and Venice signed a peace treaty on 1 June 1355.

1354 in Europe
Conflicts in 1354
Naval battles of the Venetian–Genoese wars
Battles in the Peloponnese
Medieval Messenia